Marie Sophie, Maria Sophia, and other variations may refer to:

 Maria Sophia of Dietrichstein (1646–1711), a German noblewoman
 Sophie Marie of Hesse-Darmstadt (1661–1712), wife of Christian, Duke of Saxe-Eisenberg
 Maria Sophia of Neuburg (1666–1699), queen consort of Portugal as the wife of King Peter II
 Marie Sophie de Courcillon (1713–1756), French salonnière, Duchess of Rohan-Rohan, and Princess of Soubise 
 Marie Sophie of Hesse-Kassel (1767-1852), queen consort of Denmark and Norway as the wife of Frederick VI
 Princess Maria Sophia of Thurn and Taxis (1800–1870), wife of Duke Paul Wilhelm of Württemberg
 Maria Sophie of Bavaria (1841-1925), queen consort of the Kingdom of the Two Sicilies as the wife of Francis II

See also
 Marie (disambiguation)
 Sophie